Rachel Chagall (born Rachel Levin) is an American actress, best known for roles as Gaby in the film Gaby: A True Story (1987), for which she was nominated for Golden Globe Award for Best Actress – Motion Picture Drama and as Val Toriello on The Nanny (1993–1999).

Life and career
Rachel Levin was born in New York City, to a Jewish family.

In 1982, she contracted Guillain–Barré syndrome, recovering sufficiently to be cast in the starring role of Gaby, A True Story.

She is perhaps best known for her role as the dimwitted sidekick Val Toriello, on the 1990s television series The Nanny.
She and her husband Greg Lenert, who was The Nanny's stage manager, had twinsa girl and a boyon March 19, 1999. 

She made guest appearances on Just Shoot Me! and Strong Medicine. She also played a mysterious woman in What I Like About You. As Rachel Levin, Chagall appeared in Gaby: A True Story (1987) in the title role as Gabriela Brimmer and White Palace (1990) in the role of Rachel. She also appeared in The Last Supper (1995). On December 6, 2004, Chagall appeared at the cast reunion for The Nanny, The Nanny Reunion: A Nosh to Remember.

Filmography

References

External links

American film actresses
American television actresses
Jewish American actresses
Living people
20th-century American actresses
21st-century American actresses
People with Guillain–Barré syndrome
21st-century American Jews
Year of birth missing (living people)